Adelind Horan is an American film, theatre, and television actress and writer. She is known for her documentary solo play about mountaintop removal in Appalachia, Cry of the Mountain, and for playing the role of Viv, a character based on Nan Goldin, in The Deuce. She appeared in the Amazon Prime Video series The Peripheral.

Early life 
Horan grew up outside of Charlottesville, Virginia, acting in local theatre productions. Her parents, Lydia Horan and Michael Horan, are both actors. She attended high school at Tandem Friends School and college at Hampshire College.

References

Sources

External links
Adelind Horan on IMDb
Official Website

Actresses from Virginia
American film actresses
American stage actresses
American web series actresses
21st-century American actresses
Year of birth missing (living people)
Living people
Actresses from Charlottesville, Virginia